Anisimovskaya is a rural locality (a village) in Beketovskoye Rural Settlement, Vozhegodsky District, Vologda Oblast, Russia. The population was 38 as of 2002.

Geography 
The distance to Vozhega is 69 km, to Beketovskaya is 15 km. Nikolskaya, Kalikinsky Bereznik, Ivankovo, Borisovo are the nearest rural localities.

References 

Rural localities in Vozhegodsky District